The 2013 Big Sky Conference men's basketball tournament ran from March 14–16, 2013. The champion of the tournament, Montana, received an automatic bid to the 2013 NCAA tournament.

Format
Unlike most Division I conference tournaments in basketball, the Big Sky tournament did not involve all of the conference's teams. With the addition of North Dakota and Southern Utah to the conference for the 2012–13 season, expanding the number of teams from 9 to 11, the tournament expanded from six teams to seven. As in previous years, qualifying was based on overall conference record. The number of teams that fail to qualify also increased by one, going from three to four. All tournament games were played at the site of the regular-season champion. The men's tournament also returned to a Thursday-Friday-Saturday format.  The field was re-seeded after the first round so the #1 seed played the lowest remaining seed, while the highest remaining seeds met in the other semifinal.

Bracket
 

Sacramento State, Eastern Washington, Portland State & Idaho State failed to qualify.

All times listed are Mountain

References

External links
 2013 Men's Basketball Championship

Tournament
Big Sky Conference men's basketball tournament
Big Sky Conference men's basketball tournament
Big Sky Conference men's basketball tournament
Basketball competitions in Missoula, Montana
College sports tournaments in Montana